The Budapest Challenger was a professional tennis tournament played on outdoor red clay courts. It was the earlier one of the two simultaneous challengers played in Hungary with the event taking place usually in May. It was part of the Association of Tennis Professionals (ATP) Challenger Tour. It was held annually at the Római Teniszakadémia in Budapest, Hungary, from 1994 to 2005, when during the 2006 Hungarian floodings the courts were washed away and the event spot was replaced by the USTA LA Tennis Open. The most successful players were Hernán Gumy with two singles titles and Nuno Marques with three doubles titles.

Past finals

Singles

Doubles

See also
Budapest Grand Prix
Stella Artois Clay Court Championships
Budapest Challenger (September)

References

External links
2005 Draw - ATP
2004 Draw - ATP
2003 Draw - ATP
2002 Draw - ATP
2001 Draw - ATP
2000 Draw - ITF
1998 Draw - ITF
1997 Draw - ITF
1996 Draw - ITF
1995 Draw - ITF
1994 Draw - ITF

ATP Challenger Tour
Clay court tennis tournaments
Tennis tournaments in Hungary